Stasya Miloslavskaya, née Anastasia Petrovna Miloslavskaya (born 4 May 1995) is a Russian stage and film actress.

Biography

Early life 
Anastasia “Stasya” Miloslavskaya was born in Moscow. Her father is a musician and composer, artistic director  her mother worked as a model, sang in musicals, and was a translator from Italian.

In 2013-2017 she studied at the Moscow Art Theatre School under Yevgeny Pisarev (ru). After graduation, she was accepted into the troupe of the Moscow Pushkin Drama Theatre.

Career
She made her film debut in 2016, playing a role in the film Pitch (ru). In 2019, she starred in the film The Bull by Boris Akopov, for her role in which she was nominated for the Golden Eagle Award.

Selected filmography

References

External links 
 
 Stasya Miloslavskaya on kino-teatr.ru

1995 births
Living people
Russian film actresses
Russian stage actresses
Russian television actresses
Actresses from Moscow
21st-century Russian actresses